The African Minifootball Champions League (AMCL) is a continental indoor minifootball competition contested by the senior men's clubs of African Minifootball Federation (AMF). The first edition was held in Tunisia in June 2019.

Results

Summaries

Performance by club

* hosts.

Participating clubs
Legend

 – Champions
 – Runners-up
 – Third place
 – Fourth place

QF – Quarter finals
GS – Group stage
q – Qualified
 — Hosts

References

External links
 African Minifootball Confederation 
African Minifootball Cup

 
Minifootball
Recurring sporting events established in 2019